Abigail Allwood is an Australian geologist and astrobiologist at the NASA Jet Propulsion Laboratory (JPL) who studies stromatolites, detection of life on other planets, and evolution of life on early Earth. Her early work gained notability for finding evidence of life in 3.45 billion year old stromatolites in the Pilbara formation in Australia, which was featured on the cover of the journal Nature. She is now a principal investigator on the Mars Rover 2020 team searching for evidence of life on Mars using the Planetary Instrument for X-Ray Lithochemistry (PIXL). Allwood is the first female and first Australian principal investigator on a NASA Mars mission.

Early life and education 

Allwood grew up in Brisbane, Australia, and was inspired by Carl Sagan and his description of the Voyager missions in the series Cosmos. She went on to accomplish an undergraduate degree in geosciences, and completed her PhD at Macquarie University in Australia in 2006 under the advisement of Dr. Malcolm Walter. During her PhD, she published on 3.45 billion years old stromatolites in the Pilbara formation, describing the diversity of early life on the Archean Earth. She went on to do postdoctoral work at JPL, where she is currently a principal investigator on the Mars rover mission set for 2020.

Research 

Allwood has published extensively on characterizing stromatolites using various techniques. In 2018, she published a study of 3.7 billion years old metasedimentary rocks in the Isua formation in Greenland. In this study, she and colleagues analyzed structures which were previously determined to be biogenic stromatolites. However, Allwood concluded that the putatively biogenic structures were structures caused by deformation, receiving media attention.

See also 
List of women in leadership positions on astronomical instrumentation projects

References 

Living people
Australian scientists
Astrobiologists
Australian women geologists
Year of birth missing (living people)
Planetary scientists
Women planetary scientists